Bree Condon is an American fashion model and actress.

Early life 
Bree Condon was adopted on July 7, 1986 and grew up in Newport Beach, California. She has 13 siblings, of whom 11 are adopted from all over the world. She graduated from Corona Del Mar High School in Newport Beach in 2004. After high school, she studied Acting at the Lost Studio by Cinda Jackson and joined the Alumni Theater Company. As part of the theater company, Condon played Hillary in the production "Masterpieces" by British playwright Sarah Daniels. She has defined playing Hillary as a "turning point" in her acting career, saying: "I took a leap straight into what I wanted but also feared, and I conquered what I knew I could.  If I hadn’t taken the chance and stepped onto that stage night after night, and felt that flying feeling under those bright lights, I may not be where I am today."

Career

Modeling
Condon has modeled for numerous major brands such as Guess, Frederick's of Hollywood, JC Penney, OPI, Smet, True Religion Jeans, Venus Swimwear, Silvian Heachand, Morellato and George Marciano. She has graced the magazine covers of Mexico's Vanidades, Argentina's Para ti, US' Brentwood, Ocean Drive, Santa Barbara Magazine and Vegas Essential. She has also been featured in Maxim magazine's swimsuit issue. In 2014, she appeared as a model in Agent Provocateur's commercial, directed by Penélope Cruz.

In 2006, she was the cover girl for a new remix version of the classic 1965 jazz album Whipped Cream & Other Delights by Herb Alpert & the Tijuana Brass. Condon wore a whipped cream bikini on the cover, echoing the famous shot of Dolores Erickson buried in a mound of cream on the 1965 cover.
From 2008 to 2018 Bree Condon has been testimonial for Melluso, leading Italian shoes brand. In 2013 the Italian newspaper Il Corriere del Mezzogiorno run on Bree a feature with pictures by Gaetano Mansi.

Acting
Condor landed the lead role of student Mandii Carson in Raspberry & Lavender (2004). She had guest roles on numerous television shows, including Eleventh Hour, Samantha Who?, My Generation, The Vampire Diaries, Revenge, The Real O'Neals and Lucifer. Condor portrayed Ruth in Lifetime's film Whitney (2015), based on singer Whitney Houston. She had a recurring role as Sarah, a prosecutor working on a murder case, in the crime drama television series The Haves and the Have Nots (2017–2019). She portrayed Kimberly Guilfoyle in the drama film Bombshell (2019), based upon the accounts of the women at Fox News who set out to expose CEO Roger Ailes for sexual harassment. To prepare for her role as Kimberly, Condon read her book and watched videos of her online. Bombshell received generally favorable reviews and grossed $61.4 million at the worldwide box office.

Personal life 
In 2010, it was reported that Condon had been a victim of an unusual identity-theft scam, in which a man had impersonated her on dating websites and social media for two years, and had induced others (believing they were in communication with the real Condon) to send him money and gifts. When she became aware of the impersonator, Condon hired a private investigator and worked with the authorities to secure his arrest.

She married Jamie Harris, son of Irish actor Richard John Harris in August 2019, in San Miguel De Allende Mexico.

Filmography

References

External links
 
 

Living people
Female models from California
American film actresses
People from Inglewood, California
21st-century American women
Year of birth missing (living people)